Side Hustle is an American buddy comedy television series created by Dave Malkoff that premiered on Nickelodeon on November 7, 2020. It lasted two seasons, with the final episode airing on June 30, 2022. The series stars Jules LeBlanc, Jayden Bartels, Isaiah Crews, Mitchell Berg, and Jacques Chevelle.

Premise 
In the town of Altoonisburg, smart and sarcastic Lex, tough and confident Presley, and their quirky male friend Munchy find themselves in a sticky situation after an accidental mishap destroys a boat belonging to Munchy's father, Principal Tedward. Forced to come up with creative ways to earn money to pay for the damages, the best friends enlist the help of Presley's tech-savvy younger brother, Fisher, to create an app called "Kid-DING" to connect with people looking for help with small jobs. With Munchy's bossy older brother Jaget making sure they keep up with the payments, the three friends must do any jobs that come their way no matter how crazy they are.

Halfway through season two, Presley manages to win a new boat for Tedward by winning a thumb wrestling competition allowing Tedward to call off Lex, Presley, and Munchy's debt to him. Unfortunately, they accidentally use their celebratory fireworks to destroy Jaget's new dune buggy causing Jaget to take over Kid-DING so that they can pay for the damages to his dune buggy.

Cast and characters

Main 
 Jules LeBlanc as Lex, Presley's best friend who likes school and following the rules
 Jayden Bartels as Presley, Lex's best friend who is tough and confident 
 Isaiah Crews as Munchy, Lex and Presley's quirky male friend
 Mitchell Berg as Fisher, Presley's younger brother who is a scientific genius and inventor, and has a crush on Lex
 Jacques Chevelle as Jaget, Munchy's conventional older brother who does not approve of Lex, Presley and Munchy, and is a crossing guard

Recurring 
 Daryl C. Brown as Tedward, Munchy and Jaget's father and Lex and Presley's school principal who orders them to pay for the fire damage to his boat which lasts until "Thumb and Thumber"
 Kurt Ela as Alan, Presley and Fisher's quirky father 
 Menik Gooneratne as Sophia Fugazi, a popular fashion blogger
 Matthew Sato as Spenders (season 1), the manager of Presley and Lex's favorite milkshake shop, MicroMooery
 Lilimar as Buckles, the owner of MicroMooery's competitor, Froyo-Yoyo
 Reyn Doi as Horrigan, Fisher's lab assistant
 Matte Martinez as Ty, Spenders' cousin who takes over running the Mooery when Spenders leaves town to open a new MicroMooery
 Leah Mei Gold as Gloria, an ardent student of Jaget's Jag-Jitsu martial arts class and Fisher's love interest
 Luke Mullen as Luke, Lex's love interest and an Altoonisburg student who wants to become a veterinarian

Notable guest stars 
 Eric Allan Kramer as Briles, a man who works at the city dump
 Kensington Tallman as Ruby, Lex's visiting younger cousin, who develops a crush on Fisher
 Terry Crews as Nedward, Munchy's uncle and Tedward's brother
 Darci Lynne as The Wombat, a "fixer" who wears a tuxedo

Production 
On February 24, 2020, it was announced that Nickelodeon ordered Side Hustle from creator Dave Malkoff, a multi-camera buddy comedy series starring Annie LeBlanc as Lex and Jayden Bartels as Presley. Also starring in the series are Isaiah Crews – son of actor Terry Crews – as Munchy, Mitchell Berg as Fisher, and Jacques Chevelle as Jaget. Dave Malkoff serves as executive producer. John Beck and Ron Hart serve as executive producers and showrunners. 

On January 7, 2021, it was announced that Nickelodeon had ordered seven more episodes of the series, bringing the first season order to 20 episodes. On March 18, 2021, it was announced that Nickelodeon had ordered six additional episodes of the series, bringing the revised first season order to 26 episodes. On September 1, 2021, it was announced that Nickelodeon renewed the series for a 20-episode second season. The second season premiered on October 2, 2021, and ended on June 30, 2022.

Episodes

Series overview

Season 1 (2020–21)

Season 2 (2021–22)

Ratings 
 

| link2             = #Season 2 (2021–22)
| episodes2         = 21
| start2            = 
| end2              = 
| startrating2      = 0.27
| endrating2        = 0.30
| viewers2          = |2}} 
}}

References

External links 
 
 

2020s American children's comedy television series
2020s Nickelodeon original programming
2020 American television series debuts
2022 American television series endings
English-language television shows